Lower Tsitika River Provincial Park is a provincial park in British Columbia, Canada.

History
The park was established on July 12, 1995.

Geography
This park protects the lands between three previously established Ecological Reserves, namely Tsitika Mountain Ecological Reserve, Mt. Derby Ecological Reserve and Robson Bight (Michael Bigg) Ecological Reserve.

Conservation
The reserve helps to protect the upland portions of Robson Bight (Michael Bigg) Ecological Reserve and its sensitive Orca habitat.

Recreation
The recreational activities available are backcountry camping, hiking and fishing. The park receives minimal visits as hikers are prohibited from entering the Tsitika River estuary.

See also
List of British Columbia Provincial Parks
List of Canadian provincial parks

External links
Lower Tsitika River Provincial Park at BC Parks

Provincial parks of British Columbia
Northern Vancouver Island
1995 establishments in British Columbia
Protected areas established in 1995